This is a list of islands of Pakistan

Balochistan coast:
Astola Island (also known as Haft Talar) 
Malan Island – offshore volcanic mud island that appears, disappears and reappears
Zalzala Koh – a small island that emerged offshore Gwadar in 2013 during the 2013 Balochistan earthquakes

Sindh coast:
Baba and Bhit Islands
Buddo Island
Bukkur
Bundal Island
Churna Island (also known as Charna) 
Clifton Oyster Rocks – small islets
Khiprianwala Island
Manora (also known as Manoro)
Shams Pir
Hawkesbay
Dhari Island, Karachi, Sindh, Pakistan
Pimo Island (Tido) Karachi

See also
Pakistan Islands Development Authority

References

External links
 List of islands of Pakistan at 

Pakistan, List of islands of

Islands